The 2019 FIFA Women's World Cup was an international women's association football tournament held in France from 7 June until 7 July 2019. The 24 national teams involved in the tournament were required to register a squad of 23 players, including three goalkeepers. Only players in these squads were eligible to take part in the tournament.

A provisional list of between 23 and 50 players per national team was submitted to FIFA by 26 April 2019, which was not published. From the preliminary squad, the final list of 23 players per national team was submitted to FIFA by 24 May 2019, two weeks prior to the opening match of the tournament. FIFA published the final lists with squad numbers on their website on 27 May 2019. Teams were permitted to make late replacements in the event of serious injury, at any time up to 24 hours before their first match, where the replacement players did not need to be in the preliminary squad.

The age listed for each player is on 7 June 2019, the first day of the tournament. The numbers of caps and goals listed for each player do not include any matches played after the start of the tournament. The club listed is the club for which the player last played a competitive match prior to the tournament. A flag is included for coaches who are of a different nationality than their own national team.

Group A

France
Head coach: Corinne Diacre

The final 23-player squad was announced on 2 May 2019.

Nigeria
Head coach:  Thomas Dennerby

A 27-player provisional squad was revealed on 13 May 2019. The final 23-player squad was announced on 24 May 2019.

Norway
Head coach:  Martin Sjögren

The final 23-player squad was announced on 2 May 2019.

South Korea
Head coach: Yoon Deok-yeo

A 28-player provisional squad was revealed on 30 April 2019. The final 23-player squad was announced on 17 May 2019.

Group B

China PR
Head coach: Jia Xiuquan

A 26-player provisional squad was revealed on 24 May 2019. The final squad was announced on 27 May.

Germany
Head coach: Martina Voss-Tecklenburg

The final 23-player squad was announced on 14 May 2019, as well as 5 players being named as a standby list.

South Africa
Head coach: Desiree Ellis

The final 23-player squad was announced on 17 May 2019.

Spain
Head coach: Jorge Vilda

The final 23-player squad was announced on 20 May 2019.

Group C

Australia
Head coach: Ante Milicic

The final 23-player squad was announced on 14 May 2019, as well as Kyra Cooney-Cross and Kyah Simon being named as standby players. Laura Alleway was ruled out due to injury and was replaced by Karly Roestbakken on 6 June 2019.

Brazil
Head coach: Vadão

The final 23-player squad was announced on 16 May 2019. On 17 May 2019, Adriana was replaced by Luana due to injury. On 3 June 2019, Fabiana was replaced by Poliana due to injury. On 7 June 2019, Érika was replaced by Daiane due to injury.

Italy
Head coach: Milena Bertolini

A 26-player provisional squad was revealed on 30 April 2019. The final 23-player squad was announced on 24 May 2019.

Jamaica
Head coach: Hue Menzies

22 players of the final 23-player squad were announced on 22 May 2019. Havana Solaun was named as the 23rd player on 23 May 2019 after receiving clearance from FIFA. Mireya Grey replaced injured Kayla McCoy on 6 June 2019.

Group D

Argentina
Head coach: Carlos Borrello

A 26-player provisional squad was revealed on 30 April 2019. The final 23-player squad was announced on 22 May 2019.

England
Head coach: Phil Neville

The final 23-player squad was announced on 8 May 2019.

Japan
Head coach: Asako Takakura

The final 23-player squad was announced on 10 May 2019. Riko Ueki injured her knee and was replaced by Saori Takarada on 31 May 2019.

Scotland
Head coach: Shelley Kerr

The final 23-player squad was announced on 15 May 2019.

Group E

Cameroon
Head coach: Alain Djeumfa

A 26-player provisional squad was revealed on 4 May 2019. The final 23-player squad was announced on 24 May 2019.

Canada
Head coach:  Kenneth Heiner-Møller

The final 23-player squad was announced on 25 May 2019.

Netherlands
Head coach: Sarina Wiegman

The final 23-player squad was announced on 10 April 2019, as well as 7 players being named as a standby list.

New Zealand
Head coach:  Tom Sermanni

The final 23-player squad was announced on 29 April 2019. Meikayla Moore was ruled out due to a ruptured Achilles and replaced by Nicole Stratford on 9 June 2019.

Group F

Chile
Head coach: José Letelier

The 23-player squad was announced on 19 May 2019. Fernanda Pinilla replaced injured Ana Gutiérrez.

Sweden
Head coach: Peter Gerhardsson

The final 23-player squad was announced on 16 May 2019.

Thailand
Head coach: Nuengrutai Srathongvian

A 25-player provisional squad was revealed on 16 May 2019. This was later reduced to the final 23-player list.

United States
Head coach: Jill Ellis

The final 23-player squad was announced on 1 May 2019. Instead of naming one player as captain, the United States named Carli Lloyd, Alex Morgan, and Megan Rapinoe as co-captains.

Statistics

Player representation by league system
League systems with 25 or more players represented are listed.

 The United States squad is made up entirely of players from the country's domestic league.
 The Jamaica squad is made up entirely of players employed by overseas clubs. It is also the only one of the participants' leagues that did not send any players to the tournament.

Player representation by club
Clubs with 10 or more players represented are listed.

Average age of squads

References

External links

Squads
2019